Bankura Sammilani Medical College and Hospital is a hospital and medical college in the Bankura district of the Indian state of West Bengal.

History
Bankura Sammilani Medical College in its current form was established in the year 1956 by Bankura Sammilani Trust as a part of Swaraj movement against the British rule. The college was taken over by the Government of West Bengal in 1961 with an initial student strength of 25, recognised by the Medical Council of India. MCI also officially recognized its postgraduate degree courses in General Medicine, General Surgery, Pediatrics and Gynecology & Obstetrics since 2009 and in Pathology and Preventive and Social medicine since 2010. More PG seats in Anatomy, Physiology, Biochemistry, Pharmacology, Microbiology, Dermatology, Radio-diagnosis, General Surgery (additional seats), G&O (additional seats), Paediatrics, & Anesthesia were also permitted by the MCI in the year 2013. Now the total UG seats and PG seats at B.S. Medical College are 200 and 78 respectively in each year.

Location 
This Government institution is located in Bankura District of West Bengal. It has two big campuses, spreading from Lokepur to Gobindanagar. The administrative building, the Pre-clinical departments (First Prof M.B.B.S.), two lecture theaters of 180 capacity each (with e-class room facility) and the OPD/ Indoor facilities of Ophthalmology, Cardiology, Neurology and Dialysis Units are located at Super speciality building campus. The main campus of the hospital, the Para-clinical and Clinical departments, three lecture theaters with audiovisual aids and e-class room facility (2x 180 capacity and 1x350 capacity) are situated at Gobindanagar campus. Seven Hostels for students and residents and staff quarters are situated at both the campuses.

Admission and courses
This Government Medical College is affiliated to West Bengal University of Health Sciences since 2003. Before that it awarded degrees from the  Calcutta University.

It has 200 MBBS seats since 2019 and 78 postgraduate degree seats (in 15 disciplines).

Other features 

 There are 5 hostels for boys (Namely: Dr. S.R. Bhattacharya, Dr. B.C. Roy, Junior Boy's Hostel, Chummery and Rabin Hall) and 2 hostels for girls.
 There is one large play ground situated at Gobindanagr campus, just in front of Dr S.R.Bhattacharya hostel, which hosts all intra-college outdoor tournaments. Another two play grounds are situated beside Boys' hostel at Gobindanagar campus and also Lokepur campus respectively. 
 All hostels are equipped with a canteen for boys and girls.
 Small grounds inside all hostel campuses are the place to host indoor tournaments like badminton, football, volleyball, short cricket etc.
 All hostels are equipped with common room, but no gym rooms, games room and cable Television connections.

Library 

The library (>25000 sq.ft area) is situated at the top floor of Nutan Bhaban Building at Gobindanagar campus. There are more than 15,000 medical books and over 3,000 medical journals (more than 120 titles per year). Air-conditioned Computer section has more than 40 computers for UG students and another 10 for resident doctors and staff. Separate Air-conditioned reading rooms for UG students (200 seats inside, 150 seats outside), PG students (78 seats) and staff (50 seats) are available. The whole library is wi-fi zone and totally under CCTV surveillance.

See also

References

External links 

Bankura Sammilani Medical College
Bankura Sammilani Alumni

Medical colleges in West Bengal
Affiliates of West Bengal University of Health Sciences
Universities and colleges in Bankura district
Educational institutions established in 1956
1956 establishments in West Bengal